Federalist No. 32 is an essay by Alexander Hamilton, the thirty-second of The Federalist Papers. It was published on January 2, 1788, under the pseudonym Publius, the name under which all The Federalist papers were published. This is the third of seven essays by Hamilton on the then-controversial issue of taxation. It is titled "The Same Subject Continued: Concerning the General Power of Taxation".

The Federalist Papers, as a foundation text of constitutional interpretation, are frequently cited by American jurists. Of all the essays, No. 32 is the fifth-most frequently cited.

Notes
 Ira C. Lupu, "The Most-Cited Federalist Papers." 15 Constitutional Commentary 403-410 (1998)

External links 

 Text of The Federalist No. 32: congress.gov

32
1788 in American law
1788 essays